Ivan Valentynovych Romanchuk (born 7 March 1990) is a Ukrainian football striker.

Club history
Ivan Romanchuk began his football career in Vorskla Reserves in Poltava. He transferred to FC Kremin Kremenchuk during 2009 summer transfer window on a half-year loan.

Career statistics

References

External links
  Profile – Official Kremin site
  FC Kremin Kremenchuk Squad on the PFL website
  Profile on the FFU website
  Profile on the UPL website
 Profile on Football Squads

1990 births
Living people
Ukrainian footballers
FC Vorskla Poltava players
FC Kremin Kremenchuk players
FC Helios Kharkiv players
Association football forwards
Sportspeople from Ivano-Frankivsk